Da Cal is a surname. Notable people with the surname include:

Ernesto Guerra Da Cal (1911–1994), Galician writer and philologist, father of Enric 
Enric Ucelay-Da Cal (born 1948), Spanish historian, son of Ernesto